The Leyland-DAB articulated bus was an articulated bus manufactured by Leyland-DAB in Denmark. The Leyland-DAB artic found customers in Denmark, and was the first modern style  articulated bus in the United Kingdom, albeit with limited repeat orders.

Leyland, being a mainly British manufacturer, had also had an overseas manufacturing interest in the Danish manufacturer Danish Automobile Building (DAB) since 1953, which used a number of Leyland parts in its own bus models. As a continental manufacturer, it had developed its own articulated bus model as an alternative to Volvo's articulated chassis. These were built with two body designs.

National body type

The first models of 1979 were based on the Leyland National, but were powered by a Saurer 240 bhp underfloor engine and Allison fully-automatic transmission instead of the Leyland components. Other parts like the axles and the steering mechanism were also from Leyland.

Four of these buses saw extended trials in the United Kingdom with the South Yorkshire Passenger Transport Executive, (SYPTE) and were demonstrated with other UK operators, with seven purchased by British Airways.

DAB body type
Later deliveries from 1985 employed all Leyland components again, but with DAB designed bodies. This bus saw use in Denmark. In the UK, SYPTE bought 13 in 1985.

Australia
In 1980, Australian operator Darwin Bus Service had a Leyland-DAB bodied by Pressed Metal Corporation South Australia.

References

Further reading
Chapter 18: Danish Bus Builders, 4.1. DAB Bus Explorer
The Bending Bus Chesterfield Bus Society

External links

Articulated buses
Articulated